Johannes Moser may refer to:

 Johannes Moser (ethnologist), German ethnologist
 Johannes Moser (cellist) (born 1979), German cellist